Midgard Glacier is a glacier in the Sermersooq municipality, Eastern Greenland.

This glacier is named after Midgard, one of the Nine Worlds in Norse mythology.

Geography
The Midgard Glacier is located on the eastern side of the Greenland ice sheet, at the southern limit of Schweizerland. It flows from the Femstjernen in the NE, just east of the  Fenris Glacier. Its terminus is in the Ningerti, one of the northernmost branches of Sermilik (Egede og Rothes Fjord), a large fjord system where there are a number of other glaciers discharging such as the Helheim Glacier.

See also
List of glaciers in Greenland

References

External links
 Glaciers Not On Simple, Upward Trend Of Melting sciencedaily.com, Feb. 21, 2007 "Two of Greenland's largest glaciers (Kangerdlugssuaq and Helheim) shrank dramatically ... between 2004 and 2005. And then, less than two years later, they returned to near their previous rates of discharge.

Glaciers of Greenland
Sermersooq